Michel Marella (born 28 September 1946) is a French former footballer who played as a forward. He is known for playing a key part in Paris Saint-Germain's successive promotions in 1973 and 1974 to make their way back to the Division 1.

Career

Early career and military service 
Marella was born in Grasse, in the Alpes-Maritimes department of France. He played youth football with Cannes, the club he would later rejoin as a pro. In 1964, at the age of 17, Marella stopped playing football. He began to play tennis and boules instead, and then left for the army at the Fort Carré in Antibes, "the equivalent of INSEP," according to him. With the army, he would briefly play for Antibes's football team, and then with US Issoire in the Division d'Honneur. He then left for Paris. There, he had a Corsican friend who wanted him to come play at AS Banque de France, which he did from 1971 to 1972.

Paris Saint-Germain 
In 1972, Camille Choquier, who was then goalkeeper at Paris Saint-Germain (PSG), came to Marella to ask to come join him at PSG, when the club was in the Division 3 following the split with Paris FC (PFC). Choquier knew Marella previously, having seen him play in Cannes. Marella accepted the invitation, and he joined PSG that year.

With Paris Saint-Germain, Marella was promoted to the Division 2 in his first season. They followed up with a successive promotion to the Division 1 in 1974 to bring the club back to the professional level it had prior to the split with Paris FC. Meanwhile, PFC suffered relegation to the Division 2. Marella played a large part in securing first division football, as he was one of the goal-scorers during PSG's 4–2 play-off victory over Valenciennes at the Parc des Princes in 1974.

In an interview with PSG70, Marella said that he "played football while having a job on the side". When Louis Floch joined PSG on a professional contract, Marella was relegated to the bench; he was not on a pro contract. He would leave the club in 1975, having scored a total of 14 goals and made 58 appearances across three seasons.

Return to Cannes 
Marella subsequently joined his former youth club Cannes in 1975. He stayed there one season in the Division 2, making 31 league appearances and scoring 9 league goals.

Grasse 
In 1977, Marella signed for his hometown club of Grasse. Achieving promotion to the Division 4, he would retire there in 1982.

Personal life 
While playing football at an amateur level, Marella was also an employee in a children's clothing manufacturing company called Katimini. Additionally, he was a real estate agent in Grasse in for over 32 years.

References

External links 
 
 

1946 births
Living people
People from Grasse
French footballers
Association football forwards
FC Antibes players
Paris Saint-Germain F.C. players
AS Cannes players
RC Grasse players
French Division 3 (1971–1993) players
Ligue 2 players
Ligue 1 players
French Division 4 (1978–1993) players
Sportspeople from Alpes-Maritimes
Footballers from Provence-Alpes-Côte d'Azur